This is a list of Lollapalooza lineups, sorted by year. Lollapalooza was an annual travelling music festival organized from 1991 to 1997 by Jane's Addiction singer Perry Farrell. The concept was revived in 2003, but was cancelled in 2004. From 2005 onward, the concert has taken place almost exclusively at Grant Park, Chicago, and has played in Chile, Brazil, Argentina, Germany, and France.

Line-ups 
All information taken from various sources.

1991 

Location:
North America-including:
 Chandler, AZ
 Tinley Park, IL
 Southwestern College, Chula Vista, CA
 Irvine Meadows Amphitheater, Irvine, CA 
 Shoreline Amphitheater, Mountain View, CA 
 Sandstone Amphitheatre, Bonner Springs, KS (July 30, 1991) 
 Lake Fairfax Park, Reston, VA
 Exhibition Stadium, Toronto, ON, Canada
 Great Woods, Mansfield, MA
 Stanhope (Waterloo Village), NJ
 Saratoga Springs (SPAC), NY
 Walnut Creek Amphitheater, Raleigh, NC (August 17, 1991)
 Lakewood Amphitheater, Atlanta, GA
 Central Florida Fairgrounds, Orlando, FL (August 20, 1991)
 Blossom Music Center, Cuyahoga Falls, OH
 Fiddler's Green Amphitheater, Denver, CO 
 Pine Knob, MI
 King County Fairgrounds, Enumclaw, WA (outside of Seattle)
 Clarkston, MI
 Fair Park, Dallas, TX (August 23, 1991)
 Harriet Island, St. Paul, MN (August 1, 1991) 

Dates: July 18 – August 28, 1991

Main Stage:
 Red Hot Chili Peppers
 Jane's Addiction 
 Siouxsie and the Banshees
 Living Colour
 Nine Inch Nails
 Ice-T & Body Count 
 Butthole Surfers (occasionally billed as "BH Surfers")
 Rollins Band
 Violent Femmes
 Fishbone

Side Stage:
 Othello's Revenge (Mountain View at Shoreline Amphitheater)

1992 
Location: North America – including 
 Charlotte,NC Blockbuster Pavillion
 Phoenix, AZ
 Fiddler's Green Amphitheater, Denver, CO
 Saratoga Springs Performing Arts Center, Saratoga Springs, NY
 Irvine Meadows Amphitheater, Irvine, CA
 Shoreline Amphitheater, Mountain View, CA
 Alpine Valley Music Theater
 Central Florida Fairgrounds, Orlando, FL
 Bicentennial Park, Miami, FL
 Maryland Heights, MO
 Coca-Cola Amphitheater, Atlanta, GA
 Molson Park, Barrie, Canada
 Kitsap County Fairgrounds, Bremerton, WA
 Montage Mountain Performing Arts Center, Scranton, PA
 Great Woods, Mansfield, MA
 Lake Fairfax, Reston, VA
 Riverbend Amphitheater, Cincinnati, OH
 World Music Theater, Tinley Park, IL
 University of New Orleans, New Orleans, LA
 Blossom Music Center, Cuyahoga Falls, OH
 Pine Knob, MI
 Fort Bend County Fairgrounds, Rosenberg, TX
 Harriet Island, St Paul, MN

Dates: July 18 – September 13, 1992

Main Stage:
 Red Hot Chili Peppers
 Ministry
 Ice Cube
 Soundgarden
 The Jesus and Mary Chain
 Pearl Jam
 Lush 

Side Stage:
 Rage Against the Machine (Irvine Meadows)
 Tool (Waterloo Village, NJ; Englewood, CO)
 Jim Rose Circus Sideshow
 Sharkbait
 Archie Bell dancers
 Porno for Pyros
 Basehead
 Cypress Hill
 House of Pain
 Nudeswirl
 Sweaty Nipples
 Arson Garden
 Seaweed
 Seam
 Green Magnet School
 Boo-Yaa T.R.I.B.E.
 The Look People
 Stone Temple Pilots
 The Vulgar Boatmen
 Skrew
 Tribe
 The Authority
 Samba Hell
 Café Tacuba
 Groovement
 Gary Heffern with Ivan Kral
 Treponem Pal
 Luscious Jackson 
 Shrunken Head
 Sometime Sweet Susan
 Temple of the Dog
 Gun Cult Prophets
 Doo Rag
 Billyclub
 Sweet Lizard Illtet
 Blackcats and Bottlerockets
 Genitorturers

1993 
Location: North America

Dates: June 18 – August 7, 1993

Main Stage:
 Alice in Chains
 Primus
 Dinosaur Jr.
 Fishbone
 Arrested Development
 Front 242
 Babes in Toyland
 Tool (Side Stage at Fiddler's Green, Denver and World Music Theatre, Tinley Park) Buckeye Lake, central Ohio
 Rage Against the Machine

Side Stage:
 Verve
 Sebadoh
 Cell
 Unrest
 Mercury Rev
 Mosquito
 Free Kitten
 Royal Trux
 Tsunami
 Mutabaruka
 The Coctails
 Scrawl
 Luscious Jackson
 Truly
 Eggs
 Girls Against Boys
 Thurston Moore
 A Lighter Shade of Brown
 Glue
 The Karl Hendricks Trio
 Hurl
 The Goats
 The Runties
 Ethyl Meatplow
 Fifth Column
 Combustible Edison
 Ritual Device
 Swirlies
 Hazel
 Kill Sybil
 Charlie Hunter Trio
 Janitor Joe
 Vulgar Boatmen
 Red Red Meat
 Catherine
 Antenna
 Lambchop
 Paul K and the Weathermen
 Drop Nineteens
 Sleepyhead
 Small
 Archers of Loaf
 Vanilla Trainwreck
 Motorolla
 The Daisy Group
 Crowsdell
 Naiomi's Hair
 Brothers Grimm
 Blue Dog Love
 DOS
 DFL
 Universal Congress Of

1994 
Location: North America

Dates: July 7, 1994 – September 5, 1994

Main Stage:
 The Smashing Pumpkins
 Beastie Boys
 George Clinton & the P-Funk All Stars
 The Breeders
 A Tribe Called Quest
 Nick Cave and the Bad Seeds
 L7
 Boredoms (first half of tour)
 Green Day (second half)

Side Stage:
 The Flaming Lips
 The Verve
 The Boo Radleys
 The Frogs (first six dates only)
 Guided by Voices
 Lambchop
 Girls Against Boys
 Rollerskate Skinny
 Palace Songs
 Stereolab
 Fu-Schnickens
 The Pharcyde
 Shudder to Think
 Luscious Jackson
 King Kong
 Charlie Hunter Trio
 Shonen Knife
 Blast Off Country Style
 Souls of Mischief
 Maggie Estep

Juliette Torrez, a poet and promoter from New Mexico, organized the poetry offerings. Angelo Moore (aka Dr. Madd Vibe) and members of Fishbone performed in the poetry tent with the Beastie Boys at the Shoreline show in CA. Poet Thomas R. Peters, Jr. read poetry on all three stages at the Denver show, and poet Jason Stoneking also performed a poem on the Denver main stage. Poet Tracie Morris, among others, was hired by Lollapalooza to perform in the spoken word tent for the New York to Texas leg of the tour. The poetry tent was actually called "The Revival Tent" at the time. The Flaming Lips performed in The Revival Tent in Denver, going so far as dragging an upright acoustic piano across 100 yards of grass to do so.

Several of the artists, including Green Day and Cypress Hill, skipped at least one Lollapalooza date to appear at Woodstock '94 instead. Green Day was removed from stage at the performance at Walnut Creek Amphitheater in Raleigh, NC for encouraging general admission audience members to rush the stage and overwhelm the reserved seating area. Nirvana was scheduled to headline but officially pulled out on April 4, 1994, amid rumors that the band was on the verge of breaking up. Frontman Kurt Cobain was found dead in Seattle, Washington four days later on April 8, 1994. Cobain's widow, Courtney Love, made surprise guest appearances at several shows, speaking to the crowds about the loss. In New York, she greeted the crowd with "Hello, Generation Ecch!", a reference to Jason Cohen and Michael Krugman's Generation Ecch!: the Backlash Starts Here (Prentice Hall & IBD, 1994). Having met the authors at a party, she deemed the book hilarious, saying, "Kurt would have loved the mean stuff."

1995 
Location: North America

Dates: July 4, 1995 – August 18, 1995

Main Stage:
 Sonic Youth
 Hole
 Cypress Hill
 Pavement
 Sinéad O'Connor (first few shows; bowed out due to pregnancy)
 Elastica (replaced O'Connor, as did Moby for a few shows)
 Beck
 The Jesus Lizard
 The Mighty Mighty Bosstones

Side Stage:
 Coolio
 Doo Rag
 Possum Dixon
 Poster Children
 Yo La Tengo
 Brainiac
 The Coctails
 Geraldine Fibbers
 The Dambuilders
 Laika
 The Pharcyde
 Tuscadero
 Built to Spill
 Helium
 Redman
 [[St.Johnny,Dirty Three
 Mike Watt
 Versus
 Hum
 Blonde Redhead
 The Roots
  Blowhole
 The Zeros
 Pork Queen
 Thomas Jefferson Slave Apartments
 Sabalon Glitz
 Psychotica
 Patti Smith
 Overpass
 Moby
 Superchunk
 Beck(acoustic, generally)
 Spring Heel Jack U.S.A.
 Ariel
 Incredibly Strange Wrestling
 Gary Young's Hospital
 Dandelion

"Lab Stage":
 Shallow
 Lucifer Wong
 Clod Hopper

1996

Dates 

Main Stage: Metallica, Soundgarden, Ramones, Rancid, Shaolin monks, Screaming Trees, Psychotica

Main Stage on Selected Dates: Rage Against the Machine, Cocteau Twins, Waylon Jennings, Cheap Trick (surprise guest act), Violent Femmes, The Tea Party, Wu-Tang Clan, Steve Earle, Devo, 311

Side Stage: Beth Hart Band, Girls Against Boys, Ben Folds Five, Ruby, Cornershop, You Am I, Soul Coughing, Sponge, Melvins, Satchel, Jonny Polonsky, Fireside

Indie Stage: Chune, Moonshake, Lutefisk, Capsize 7, The Cows, Long Fin Killie, Thirty Ought Six, Varnaline, Crumb, Flesh Fetish, Pitbull Daycare, The Sneaches

1997

Dates 

Main Stage: Orbital, Devo, The Prodigy, The Orb, Tool, Snoop Doggy Dogg, Tricky, Korn (dropped out in July owing to illness), James, Julian Marley and Damian Marley, Failure

Side Stage: Failure (Failure pulled double-duty: headlining the side stage and filling the main stage void when Korn pulled out due to illness), Beck, Eels, Summercamp, Artificial Joy Club, Jeremy Toback, Dr. Octagon (dropped out), Radish, Old 97's, Inch, Porno for Pyros, The Pugs, Lost Boyz, Agnes Gooch, Demolition Doll Rods, Skeleton Key, Molly McGuire, Orbit

"The worst thing was the venues," observed The Prodigy's Liam Howlett. "They were all seated. Obviously people don't sit down to watch The Prodigy, but the security people were making them sit down. You had all the expensive seats at the front and the moshpit at the back. It was all wrong."

2003 
Location: Marcus Amphitheater, Milwaukee, Wisconsin

Dates: July 5, 2003 – August 24, 2003

Main Stage: Jane's Addiction, Audioslave, Incubus, Queens of the Stone Age (7/5-8/13), A Perfect Circle (8/15-8/23), Jurassic 5, The Donnas, Rooney, The Distillers (The Distillers moved up to the mainstage on the dates that Rooney could not play; both bands were replacements for the band Cold)

Side Stage: Steve-O, Burning Brides, Cave In, The Distillers, Kings of Leon, Thirty Seconds to Mars, The Music, Mondo Generator (filled the gap left by The Distillers), The Mooney Suzuki, Fingertight, MC Supernatural, boysetsfire, Billy Talent, Campfire Girls, Shihad (As Pacifier), Sleepy Eddie, ColdSnap, Hot Action Cop, Hierosonic, Swizzle Tree, Mr. North, Golden Buddhas, Banyan, Three5Human

2004 (Cancelled) 
A North American tour was planned with a two-day festival taking place in each city, scheduled to begin on July 14, 2004 and continue through to August 25, 2004.

The following acts were scheduled, but the tour was cancelled due to low ticket sales (most of these bands scheduled shows on the same dates as what would have been the Lollapalooza touring schedule following the tour's cancellation—this caused problems for many fans, who now had to choose which band to see):
 Pixies
 Morrissey
 PJ Harvey
 Sonic Youth
 The Killers
 Wilco
 The Flaming Lips
 The Von Bondies
 The String Cheese Incident
 Modest Mouse
 Le Tigre
 Gomez
 Black Rebel Motorcycle Club
 Danger Mouse
 The Polyphonic Spree
 Broken Social Scene
 Ross Golan
 The Datsuns
 Bumblebeez 81
 The Secret Machines
 Brayndead
 Freakshow
 Sound Tribe Sector 9
 Elbow
 Wheat
 The Coup
 Wolf Eyes
 The Dresden Dolls

2005 
Location: Grant Park, Chicago

Dates: July 23, 2005 – July 24, 2005

(Artists listed from earliest to latest set times.)

SBC West Stage

Saturday: M83, Liz Phair, Cake, Primus, Weezer
Sunday: The Ponys, Dinosaur Jr., Drive-By Truckers, Widespread Panic

SBC East Stage

Saturday: The (International) Noise Conspiracy, ...And You Will Know Us by the Trail of Dead, Dashboard Confessional, Billy Idol, Pixies
Sunday: OK Go, Kasabian, Satellite Party, Arcade Fire, The Killers

Budweiser Select Stage

Saturday: The Warlocks, Kaiser Chiefs, The Bravery, The Black Keys, Digable Planets
Sunday: Saul Williams, Louis XIV, Ben Kweller, Spoon, Death Cab for Cutie

Parkways Stage

Saturday: The Redwalls, Ambulance LTD, The Brian Jonestown Massacre, Blonde Redhead, The Walkmen
Sunday: The Changes, Blue Merle, Tegan and Sara, G. Love & Special Sauce, The Dandy Warhols

Planet Stage

Saturday: Hard-Fi, The Dead 60s, VHS or Beta, DJ Muggs, Mash Up Circus, B-Boy Breakdown Royale, DJ Z-Trip, Mark Farina
Sunday: Cathedrals, DeSoL, Los Amigos Invisibles, Soulive, Sound Tribe Sector 9, Derrick Carter

Kidapalooza

Saturday: Peter DiStefano and Perry Farrell, The Candy Band, Daddy a Go Go, Gwendolyn & the Good Time Gang
Sunday: Ella Jenkins, Daddy a Go Go, Saul Williams and Ladybug of Digable Planets (performing an impromptu set), Gwendolyn & the Good Time Gang, The Candy Band

2006 
Location: Grant Park, Chicago

Dates: August 4, 2006 – August 6, 2006

(Artists listed from earliest to latest set times.)

AT&T Stage

Friday: The Subways, Panic! at the Disco, Umphrey's McGee, The Raconteurs, Ween
Saturday: Living Things, Coheed and Cambria, Gnarls Barkley, Common, Kanye West
Sunday: Sparta, Ben Kweller, Matisyahu, Queens of the Stone Age, Red Hot Chili Peppers

Bud Light Stage

Friday: Blue October, Eels, Ryan Adams, My Morning Jacket, Death Cab for Cutie
Saturday: Nada Surf, Built to Spill, Sonic Youth, The Flaming Lips, Manu Chao
Sunday: The Redwalls, Nickel Creek, The Shins, Wilco

adidas-Champ Stage

Friday: Deadboy & the Elephantmen, Aqualung, Stars, Iron & Wine, Sleater-Kinney (Third to last show before "indefinite hiatus")
Saturday: Matt Costa, Feist, Calexico, The Dresden Dolls, Thievery Corporation
Sunday: Mucca Pazza, The Frames, Andrew Bird, Poi Dog Pondering, Blues Traveler

Q101 Stage

Friday: Sound Team, Editors, Cursive, The Secret Machines, Violent Femmes
Saturday: Tonedeff (Last Band Standing Grand Prize Winner), Be Your Own Pet, The Go! Team, Wolfmother, Smoking Popes, The New Pornographers
Sunday: Office, The Hold Steady, Thirty Seconds to Mars, She Wants Revenge, Broken Social Scene

PlayStation Stage

Friday: Midlake, Anathallo, Ohmega Watts, Jeremy Enigk, Lady Sovereign
Saturday: Sa-Ra, Sybris, Peeping Tom, Lyrics Born, Blackalicious
Sunday: Trevor Hall, Burden Brothers, Hot Chip, Pepper, The Reverend Horton Heat

AMD Stage

Friday: Mates of State, The Cankles (Last Band Standing Finalists), Ghostland Observatory, Husky Rescue, The M's, Mutemath
Saturday: Rainer Maria, Cold War Kids, Oh No Oh My, Particle, Disco Biscuits
Sunday: What Made Milwaukee Famous, Manishevitz, Benevento/Russo Duo, The New Amsterdams, of Montreal

BMI Stage

Friday: Bon Mots, Cameron McGill and What Army, Makeshifte, Kelley Stoltz, Jon McLaughlin
Saturday: Musical Outfits, St. James Inc., Lanz, Elvis Perkins, Kill Hannah
Sunday: Katie Todd Band, Catfish Haven, Manchester Orchestra, Moses Mayfield, Assassins, Deadsy

Mind Field Stage

Friday: PlayStation Competition 1: SingStar, Battle Royale 1, The Second City (Comedy). Guadalajara Joe, Battle Royale 2, Mission IMPROVable (Comedy), PlayStation Competition 2: Guitar Hero, Battle Royale 3, Mindfield Mini Movies, Schadenfreude (Comedy), Battle Royale 4, Mindfield Electronic Ambush-VHS or Beta DJ
Saturday: PlayStation Competition 1: SingStar, Battle Royale 1, The Second City (Comedy), Guadalajara Joe, Battle Royale 2, Mission IMPROVable (Comedy), PlayStation Competition 2: Guitar Hero, Battle Royale 3, Mindfield Mini Movies, Schadenfreude (Comedy), Battle Royale 4, Mindfield Electronic Ambush-DJ Rashida
Sunday: PlayStation Competition 1: SingStar, Battle Royale 1, The Second City (Comedy), Battle Royale 2, Mission IMPROVable, PlayStation Competition 2: Guitar Hero, Battle Royale 3, Super Sunday Superhero Pageant, Mindfield Electronic Ambush-Mix Master Mike, Mixin' Marc

Kidz Stage

Friday: ScribbleMonster, Kelly McQuinn and KidTribe, The Candy Band, Alvin Ailey Dancing Workshop, Remo Drum Circle, Peter DiStefano, The Blisters
Saturday: ScribbleMonster, Kelly Mcquinn and KidTribe, The Candy Band, Alvin Ailey Dancing Workshop, Ella Jenkins featuring Asheba, Remo Drum Circle featuring Asheba, Justin Roberts, Peter DiStefano's Guitar Workshop, Chutzpah, breakdancing with the Brickheadz, Remo Drum Circle
Sunday: Paul Green's School of Rock All-Stars, Kelly McQuinn and KidTribe, Perry Farrell and Peter DiStefano, Patti Smith (surprise appearance), The Candy Band, Q Brothers and Chutzpah, Asheba, Remo Drum Circle

Oregon rock band The Standard were set to play, but decided to pull out due to recording duties.

2007 
Location: Grant Park, Chicago

Dates: August 3, 2007 – August 5, 2007

(Artists listed from earliest to latest set times.)

AT&T Stage

Friday: Ghostland Observatory, Jack's Mannequin, moe., Satellite Party, Daft Punk
Saturday: Tokyo Police Club, Silverchair, Clap Your Hands Say Yeah, Yeah Yeah Yeahs, Muse
Sunday: Dax Riggs, Lupe Fiasco, Kings of Leon, My Morning Jacket, Pearl Jam

Bud Light Stage

Friday: Soulive, The Polyphonic Spree, M.I.A., The Black Keys, Ben Harper & the Innocent Criminals
Saturday: I'm from Barcelona, Stephen Marley, The Roots, Snow Patrol, Interpol
Sunday: The Cribs, Amy Winehouse, Iggy & the Stooges, Modest Mouse

adidas Stage

Friday: Elvis Perkins in Dearland, Son Volt, Sparklehorse, G. Love & Special Sauce, Femi Kuti & the Positive Force
Saturday: Matt and Kim, Pete Yorn, Sound Tribe Sector 9, Regina Spektor, Patti Smith
Sunday: Juliette and the Licks, Rodrigo y Gabriela, Paolo Nutini, Yo La Tengo, Café Tacuba

MySpace Stage

Friday: The Fratellis, Ted Leo and the Pharmacists, Slightly Stoopid, Blonde Redhead, LCD Soundsystem
Saturday: Shock Stars (Last Band Standing Winner), Sherwood, Tapes 'n Tapes, Motion City Soundtrack, The Hold Steady, Spoon
Sunday: White Rabbits, Heartless Bastards, Blue October, !!!, TV on the Radio

PlayStation Stage

Friday: Carey Ott, Colour Revolt, Charlie Musselwhite, Electric Six, The Rapture
Saturday: High Class Elite, Ryan Shaw, Sam Roberts Band, Rhymefest, Roky Erickson & the Explosives
Sunday: The Postmarks, dios (malos), Los Campesinos!, Apostle of Hustle, The Wailers

Citi Stage

Friday: Helicopters (Last Band Standing Runner-Up), Illinois, Chin Up Chin Up, Viva Voce, Against Me!, Silversun Pickups
Saturday: Arckid, The Satin Peaches, Aqueduct, Cold War Kids, Cansei De Ser Sexy (CSS) (cancelled due to last-minute travel difficulties and replaced by Matt and Kim)
Sunday: The 1900s, David Vandervelde, The Black Angels, Annuals, Peter Bjorn and John

BMI Stage

Friday: The Switches, Tom Schraeder, Bang Bang Bang, Powerspace, Inward Eye, Wax on Radio
Saturday: Dear and the Headlights, Ludo, Kevin Michael, Lady Gaga & Lady Starlight, Cage the Elephant, Back Door Slam
Sunday: The Graduate, Mr. North, Smoosh, The Diffs, John Paul White, Bound Stems

MOTO Stage

Friday: PlayStation Competition: "Buzz" Triva, The Second City (Comedy), Battle Royale rd. 1, PlayStation Competition: SingStar, Mission IMPROVable (Comedy), Battle Royale rd. 2, Matt Roan, Mickey Avalon
Saturday: PlayStation Competition: "Buzz" Trivia, The Second City (Comedy), Battle Royale rd. 1, PlayStation Competition: SingStar, Mission IMPROVable (Comedy), Battle Royale rd. 2, Josh Hopkins, DJ Klever and DJ Craze
Sunday: PlayStation Competition: "Buzz" Trivia, The Second City (Comedy), Battle Royale rd. 1, PlayStation Competition: SingStar, Mission IMPROVable (Comedy), Battle Royale rd. 2, Flosstradamus, Kid Sister

KIDZ Stage

Friday: Rock for Kids Youth Jam Band, The Hipwaders, The Sippy Cups, Peter Himmelman, Paul Green's School of Rock All-Stars
Saturday: The Candy Band, The Blisters, The Sippy Cups, The Hipwaders, Patti Smith, Jim James
Sunday: Peter Himmelman, Q Brothers, Wee Hairy Beasties, Peter DiStefano & Perry Farrell, Paul Green's School of Rock All-Stars with Perry Farrell, Ben Harper

Sean Lennon appeared on the initial lineup for Lollapalooza but was eventually removed.

2008 
Location: Grant Park, Chicago

Dates: August 1, 2008 – August 3, 2008

(Artists listed from earliest to latest set times.)

AT&T Stage

Friday: Holy Fuck (initially Noah and the Whale), Yeasayer, Gogol Bordello, Bloc Party, Radiohead
Saturday: The Ting Tings, The Gutter Twins, Brand New, Lupe Fiasco, Rage Against the Machine
Sunday: Kid Sister, Brazilian Girls, G. Love & Special Sauce, Gnarls Barkley, Kanye West

Bud Light Stage

Friday: Black Lips, The Go! Team, The Black Keys, The Raconteurs
Saturday: Does It Offend You, Yeah?, Dierks Bentley, Explosions in the Sky, Broken Social Scene, Wilco
Sunday: White Lies, The John Butler Trio, Iron & Wine, Love and Rockets, Nine Inch Nails

MySpace Stage

Friday: Bang Camaro, Rogue Wave, The Kills, Mates of State, Stephen Malkmus and the Jicks
Saturday: The Melismatics (Last Band Standing Winner), Margot & the Nuclear So and So's, Dr. Dog, MGMT, Jamie Lidell, Toadies
Sunday: The Octopus Project, The Whigs, Chromeo, Blues Traveler, Mark Ronson

PlayStation 3 Stage

Friday: K'naan, Butch Walker, Duffy, Cat Power
Saturday: De Novo Dahl, Mason Jennings, DeVotchKa, Okkervil River, Sharon Jones & The Dap-Kings
Sunday: Office, The Weakerthans (cancelled), Amadou & Mariam, Flogging Molly, The National

Citi Stage

Friday: (Last Band Standing), Sofia Talvik, Manchester Orchestra, The Enemy, Louis XIV, Free Sol, Grizzly Bear, Cansei de Ser Sexy
Saturday: Witchcraft, Ferras, Foals, Booka Shade, Spank Rock, Battles
Sunday: The Blakes, What Made Milwaukee Famous, Nicole Atkins & The Sea, Black Kids, Saul Williams, Girl Talk

Perry's Stage

Friday: Willy Joy, Zebo, Holy Fuck (DJ Set), James Curd, Million $ Mano, VHS or Beta (DJ Set)
Saturday: Dani Deahl, Devlin & Darko, Dash Mihok, Perry Farrell & Special Guest (Slash), Does It Offend You, Yeah? (DJ Set), DJ AM, DJ MomJeans
Sunday: The Glamour, Smalltown DJs, E-Six & Roan, DJ Mel, Franki Chan, Flosstradamus

BMI Stage

Friday: We Go to 11, Magic Wands, The Parlor Mob, Electric Touch, Black Joe Lewis & the Honeybears, Your Vegas, Cadence Weapon, The Cool Kids
Saturday: Krista, The Postelles, Innerpartysystem, Steel Train, Serena Ryder, DJ Bald Eagle, Uffie
Sunday: Ha Ha Tonka, Wild Sweet Orange, Tally Hall, Newton Faulkner, Eli "The Paperboy" Reed & The True Loves

Kidz Stage

Friday: Suzy Brack and the New Jack Lords, Paul Green's School of Rock All-Stars, The Dream Jam Band, The Terrible Twos, Jeff Tweedy (of Wilco), Rogue Wave, Tiny Masters of Today
Saturday: The Dream Jam Band, Tiny Masters of Today, The Jimmies, The Terrible Twos, Special Guest, Homemade Jamz Blues Band
Sunday: Q Brothers, The John Butler Trio, Homemade Jamz Blues Band, The Jimmies, G. Love & Special Sauce, Peter DiStefano & Tor Hyams, Perry Farrell & Special Guest (Slash), Paul Green's School of Rock All-Stars

Santigold appeared on the initial lineup for Lollapalooza but was eventually removed.

2009 

Location: Grant Park, Chicago

Dates: August 7, 2009 – August 9, 2009

(Artists listed from earliest to latest set times)

Chicago 2016 Stage
Friday: Hey Champ, The Gaslight Anthem, Sound Tribe Sector 9, Thievery Corporation, Depeche Mode
Saturday: Living Things, Atmosphere, Coheed and Cambria, Rise Against, Tool
Sunday: Ra Ra Riot, The Airborne Toxic Event, Vampire Weekend, Snoop Dogg, The Killers

Budweiser Stage

Friday: Manchester Orchestra, White Lies, Ben Folds, The Decemberists, Kings of Leon
Saturday: Delta Spirit, Los Campesinos!, Arctic Monkeys, TV on the Radio, Yeah Yeah Yeahs (replaced Beastie Boys)
Sunday: Friendly Fires, Kaiser Chiefs, Neko Case, Lou Reed, Jane's Addiction

Vitaminwater Stage

Friday: The Henry Clay People, Black Joe Lewis & the Honeybears, Heartless Bastards, Crystal Castles, of Montreal
Saturday: The Low Anthem, Miike Snow, Gomez, Glasvegas, Animal Collective
Sunday: Alberta Cross, Bat for Lashes, Dan Deacon, Cold War Kids, Silversun Pickups

PlayStation Stage

Friday: Hockey, Zap Mama, Bon Iver, Fleet Foxes, Andrew Bird
Saturday: Ezra Furman and the Harpoons, Federico Aubele, Robert Earl Keen, Santigold, Ben Harper and Relentless7
Sunday: Sam Roberts Band, Portugal. The Man, The Raveonettes, Dan Auerbach, Band of Horses

Citi Stage

Friday: Other Lives, The Knux, Amazing Baby, The Virgins, Asher Roth, Peter Bjorn and John
Saturday: thenewno2, Constantines, Ida Maria, Chairlift, No Age, Lykke Li
Sunday: Carney, Davy Knowles and Back Door Slam, Cage the Elephant, Gang Gang Dance, Passion Pit, Deerhunter

Perry's Stage

Friday: DJ Pasha (Last Band Standing Winner), Nick Catchdubs, DJ Mel, Dark Wave Disco, Hollywood Holt, Rye Rye (cancelled), La Roux (cancelled), The Bloody Beetroots (DJ Set), A-Trak, Simian Mobile Disco (DJ Set), Crookers, Kid Cudi
Saturday: Punky Fresh (Last Band Standing Winner), Moneypenny, Kaskade, Animal Collective (DJ Set), Prophit, Perry Farrell and Special Guest, Hercules and Love Affair (DJ Set), LA Riots, Diplo, Bassnectar
Sunday: Yello Fever, Car Stereo (Wars), He Say, She Say, The Hood Internet, The Glitch Mob, Boys Noize, MSTRKRFT, Deadmau5

BMI Stage

Friday: April Smith, Gringo Star, The Builders and the Butchers, Kevin Devine, Eric Church
Saturday: Band of Skulls, Dirty Sweet, Langhorne Slim, Joe Pug, Blind Pilot
Sunday: Mike's Pawn Shop, Esser, The Greencards, Priscilla Renea (replaced Neon Hitch), Ke$ha

Kidz Stage

Friday: Yuto Miyazawa, Paul Green's School of Rock All-Stars, Frances England, Secret Agent 23 Skidoo, Zach Gill (from ALO), Special Guest, Lunch Money
Saturday: Frances England, Zach Gill (from ALO), Quinn Sullivan, Secret Agent 23 Skidoo, Care Bears on Fire, Special Guest, Ralph's World
Sunday: Care Bears on Fire, Q Brothers, Ralph's World, Peter DiStefano & Tor Hyams, Perry Farrell, Paul Green's School of Rock All-Stars with Perry Farrell

2010 

Location: Grant Park, Chicago

Dates: August 6, 2010 – August 8, 2010

(Artists listed from earliest to latest set times)

Parkways Foundation
Friday: Balkan Beat Box, Raphael Saadiq, Devo, Hot Chip, Lady Gaga
Saturday: Rebelution, Blues Traveler, Gogol Bordello, Social Distortion, Green Day
Sunday: Nneka, The Cribs, X Japan, Wolfmother, Soundgarden

Budweiser Stage
Friday: Wavves, Mavis Staples, The New Pornographers, The Black Keys, The Strokes
Saturday: The Soft Pack, Stars, Grizzly Bear, Spoon, Phoenix
Sunday: The Antlers, Blitzen Trapper, Yeasayer, MGMT, Arcade Fire

PlayStation Stage
Friday: B.o.B, Los Amigos Invisibles, Drive-By Truckers, Dirty Projectors, Jimmy Cliff
Saturday: The Kissaway Trail, Wild Beasts, The xx, Metric, Cut Copy
Sunday: Miniature Tigers, The Dodos, Mumford & Sons, Mutemath, The National

adidas Stage
Friday: Javelin, The Walkmen, The Big Pink, Matt & Kim, Chromeo
Saturday: Mimicking Birds, Rogue Wave, Against Me!, AFI, Slightly Stoopid
Sunday: Health, Switchfoot, Minus the Bear, Erykah Badu, Cypress Hill

Sony bloggie
Friday: Foxy Shazam, The Constellations, American Bang, Cymbals Eat Guitars, Fuck Buttons, Jamie Lidell
Saturday: The Morning Benders, Harlem, Warpaint, Dawes, Deer Tick, Edward Sharpe and the Magnetic Zeros
Sunday: Frank Turner, Company of Thieves, The Ike Reilly Assassination, Hockey, Frightened Rabbit, The Temper Trap

Perry's Stage
Friday: LDJS Remix, BBU, Ancient Astronauts, Ana Sia, Peanut Butter Wolf, Kidz in the Hall, J. Cole, Caspa, Erol Alkan, Tiga, 2ManyDJs
Saturday: Lance Herbstrong, Only Children, Vonnegutt, FreeSol, Beats Antique, Wolfgang Gartner, Steve Porter, Joachim Garraud, PerryEtty vs. Chris Cox, DJ Snake, Kaskade, Rusko, DJ Mel, Empire of the Sun
Sunday: Dani Deahl, Team Bayside High, Felix Cartal, Didi Gutman of Brazilian Girls, Nervo, Chiddy Bang, Mexican Institute of Sound, Dirty South, Flosstradamus, Felix da Housecat, Digitalism (DJ Set) The Unknown Facez Hardstyle dj set

BMI Stage
Friday: These United States, The Ettes, Jukebox the Ghost, My Dear Disco, Semi Precious Weapons, Neon Trees
Saturday: MyNameIsJohnMichael, Skybox, Dragonette, Dan Black, Royal Bangs
Sunday: Son of a Bad Man, Neon Hitch, The Band of Heathens, Freelance Whales, Violent Soho

Kidzapalooza Stage
Friday: The Happiness Club, School of Rock, The Candy Band, Tim and the Space Cadets, Rocknoceros, Ed Kowalczyk, Recess Monkey
Saturday: Tim and the Space Cadets, The Candy Band, Rocknoceros, The Verve Pipe, The Happiness Club, Dan Zanes and the Chicago Youth Symphony Orchestra, JP. Chrissie & the Fairground Boys
Sunday: School of Rock, Q Brothers, Recess Monkey, Dan Zanes and the Chicago Youth Symphony Orchestra, Peter DiStefano & Tor, Thenewno2, Perry Farrell, The Verve Pipe

2011

Lollapalooza Chile

Lollapalooza

2012

Lollapalooza Chile

Lollapalooza Brazil

Lollapalooza

2013

Lollapalooza Chile

Lollapalooza Brazil

Lollapalooza

2014

Lollapalooza Chile

Lollapalooza Argentina

Lollapalooza Brazil

Lollapalooza

2015

Lollapalooza Argentina

Lollapalooza Brazil

Lollapalooza Chile

Lollapalooza

Lollapalooza Berlin

2016

Lollapalooza Brazil

Lollapalooza Argentina

Lollapalooza Chile

Lollapalooza

Lollapalooza Berlin

2017

Lollapalooza Brazil

Lollapalooza Argentina

Lollapalooza Chile

Lollapalooza Paris

Lollapalooza

Lollapalooza Berlin

2018

Lollapalooza Argentina

Lollapalooza Chile

Lollapalooza Brazil

Lollapalooza Paris

Lollapalooza

Lollapalooza Berlin

2019

Lollapalooza Argentina

Lollapalooza Chile

Lollapalooza Brazil

Lollapalooza Stockholm

Lollapalooza Paris

Lollapalooza

Lollapalooza Berlin

2020 
All editions of Lollapalooza were canceled in 2020 due to the COVID-19 pandemic.

Lollapalooza Stockholm (Canceled)

Lollapalooza Paris (Canceled)

Lollapalooza Berlin (Canceled)

Lollapalooza Brazil (Canceled)

Lollapalooza Argentina (Canceled)

2021 
The Stockholm, Paris, and Brasil editions of the festival were also canceled in 2021 due to the COVID-19 pandemic.

Lollapalooza

2022

Lollapalooza Argentina

Lollapalooza Chile

Lollapalooza Brazil

Lollapalooza

Lollapalooza Stockholm

Lollapalooza Paris

References 

Rock festivals in the United States